Luis Felipe "Pipe" Gómez Miranda (born 11 October 1999) is a Colombian professional footballer who plays as a forward for Portuguese club Nacional on loan from Leones.

Club career
Gómez is a youth product of the Colombian academies Nuevo Milenio and Cyclones Cali, before moving to Leones in 2018. He made his professional debut with Leones in a 0–0 Categoría Primera A tie with Once Caldas on 9 October 2018. He was the top scorer in the 2021 Categoría Primera B season, with 18 goals. On 1 February 2022, he joined the Portuguese club Santa Clara on loan in the Primeira Liga. 

On 22 August 2022, Gómez moved on loan to Nacional.

References

External links
 

1999 births
Sportspeople from Cartagena, Colombia
21st-century Colombian people
Living people
Colombian footballers
Association football forwards
Leones F.C. footballers
C.D. Santa Clara players
C.D. Nacional players
Categoría Primera A players
Categoría Primera B players
Primeira Liga players
Liga Portugal 2 players
Colombian expatriate footballers
Colombian expatriate sportspeople in Portugal
Expatriate footballers in Portugal